Tadelech Bekele (born 11 April 1991) is an Ethiopian long-distance runner.

Career 

In 2012, she won the České Budějovice Half Marathon with a time of 1:10:54. In this year she also won the Prague Grand Prix with a time of 15:48, the last year that the Prague Grand Prix was a five kilometres run for women.

In 2014, she won the Berlin Half Marathon with a time of 1:10:05.
In 2017 and 2018 she won the Amsterdam Marathon.

In the Berlin Marathon she finished in 4th place in both the 2014 Berlin Marathon and the 2015 Berlin Marathon.

In the 2018 London Marathon she finished in 3rd place with a time of 2:21:40.

Achievements

References

External links 

 

Living people
1991 births
Place of birth missing (living people)
Ethiopian female long-distance runners
Ethiopian female marathon runners
21st-century Ethiopian women